The Bellingham Railway Museum in Bellingham, Washington, USA, displays a pictorial and text history of railroad traffic in Bellingham and Whatcom/Skagit Counties, as well as a large electric model railroad, an exhibit of railroad lanterns, and a train simulator based on Microsoft Train Simulator software.  A research library is also hosted. It opened in 2003 and is volunteer operated.

References

External links
 Official website

Railroad museums in Washington (state)
Museums in Bellingham, Washington